Sir Robert Adair GCB (24 May 1763 – 3 October 1855) was a distinguished British diplomat, and frequently employed on the most important diplomatic missions.

He was the son of Robert Adair, sergeant-surgeon to George III, and Lady Caroline Keppel, daughter of Willem Anne van Keppel, 2nd Earl of Albemarle.  He was educated at Westminster School and the University of Göttingen, and then studied law at Lincoln's Inn, but hardly practised as a barrister.

He hoped to gain office as Under-secretary of State to Charles James Fox, but he was in opposition.  Following the French Revolution, he travelled in Europe, visiting Berlin, Vienna, and St Petersburg to study the effects of the revolution and equip himself for a diplomatic career.

He became Whig Member of Parliament (MP) for Appleby (1799–1802) and Camelford (1802–12).

In 1805, he made a disastrous marriage to Angélique Gabrielle, daughter of the marquis de l'Escuyer d'Hazincourt (known as ‘Talleyrand's spy’), but this kept him out of office when Fox returned to government. Instead Fox sent him to Vienna.  In June 1808, George Canning transferred him to Constantinople. He was created a KCB in that year for his services there. He was appointed a Privy Counsellor in 1828.

He was employed in Belgium from 1831 to 1835, where he succeeded in preventing a war between Belgium and The Netherlands. This exploit won for him the rank of GCB and a pension  of £2000 per year from 1831, and also the grand'cross of the Belgian order of Leopold in 1835. He then visited Prussia.  In the 1840s, he published memoirs of his diplomatic activities in the 1800s.

References
W. P. Courtney, 'Adair, Sir Robert (1763–1855)', rev. H. C. G. Matthew, Oxford Dictionary of National Biography (Oxford University Press, 2004; online edition, January 2008)

External links 
 

1763 births
1855 deaths
British MPs 1796–1800
Knights Grand Cross of the Order of the Bath
Members of Lincoln's Inn
Members of the Parliament of Great Britain for English constituencies
Members of the Privy Council of the United Kingdom
Members of the Parliament of the United Kingdom for constituencies in Cornwall
Members of the Parliament of the United Kingdom for English constituencies
UK MPs 1801–1802
UK MPs 1802–1806
UK MPs 1806–1807
UK MPs 1807–1812
Whig (British political party) MPs for English constituencies
Ambassadors of the United Kingdom to the Ottoman Empire
People educated at Westminster School, London
University of Göttingen alumni